The ALCO PA was a family of A1A-A1A diesel locomotives built to haul passenger trains. The locomotives were built in Schenectady, New York, in the United States, by a partnership of the American Locomotive Company (ALCO) and General Electric (GE) between June, 1946 and December, 1953. Designed by General Electric's Ray Patten (along with their ALCO FA cousins), they were of a cab unit design; both cab-equipped lead A unit PA and cabless booster B unit PB models were built. While externally the PB models were slightly shorter than the PA model, they shared many of the same characteristics, both aesthetically and mechanically. However, they were not as reliable as EMD E-units.

ALCO's designation of P indicates that they were geared for higher speeds and passenger use, whereas the F designation marks these locomotives as being geared primarily for freight use. However, beyond this, their design was largely similar - aside from the PA/PB's both being larger A1A-A1A types with an even more striking nose - and many railroads used PA and FA locomotives for both freight and passenger service.

Although the majority of the PAs and PBs have been scrapped, six examples have survived. Five PAs are now preserved in railroad museums, while a converted PB still remains in service as a power car.

Service history

There were two models of PAs: the  PA-1/PB-1, which was built between September 1946 and June 1950, and the  PA-2/PB-2, which was built between April, 1950 and December, 1953.

The PAs, as well as their cousins, the ALCO FAs, were born as a result of ALCO's development of a new diesel engine design, the Model 244.  In early 1944, development started on the new design, and by November 1945 the first engines were beginning to undergo tests.  This unusually-short testing sequence was brought about by the decision of ALCO's senior management that the engine and an associated line of road locomotives had to be introduced no later than the end of 1946.

In preparation for this deadline, by January, 1946, the first 16-cylinder 244 engines were being tested, and, while a strike delayed work on the locomotives, the first two PA units were released for road tests in June, 1946 for testing for one month on the Lehigh Valley Railroad. After these first tests were completed, the locomotives returned to the factory for refurbishment and engine replacement.

In September, 1946, the first production units, an A-B-A set of PA1s in Santa Fe colors, numbered #51L, 51A and 51B, were released from the factory and sent to New York's Waldorf-Astoria Hotel, which had a private railroad siding, for exhibition before being launched into road service. This EMD repowering of the PAs was economically unfeasible, and the remaining Santa Fe PAs retained their 244 engines.

Four PA-1s previously operated by the Santa Fe were sold to Delaware and Hudson Railway in 1967. In 1974-1975, they were rebuilt for the D&H as PA-4s by Morrison-Knudsen and equipped with ALCO's 251 V-12 engines. Under D&H ownership, they were used by Amtrak for the Adirondack, and later by the Massachusetts Bay Transit Authority, before being sold to the Ferrocarriles Nacionales de México in 1978. They would be operated by the N de M until 1981.

Fans deemed the PA one of the most beautiful diesels and an "Honorary Steam Locomotive", as noted by Professor George W. Hilton in a book review in September, 1968 Trains Magazine. When accelerating, until the turbocharger came up to speed, thick clouds of black smoke would pour from the exhaust stacks due to turbo lag. Photographing a moving PA while smoking became a prime objective of railfans.<ref>Ingles, J. David, Passenger Diesel Turned Legend, Trains Magazine January, 1997, p.54.</ref>

 Original owners 

Foreign sales
The PA-2 units sold to the  broad gauge Companhia Paulista de Estradas de Ferro of São Paulo State in Brazil were equipped with a bar pilot and solid horizontal steel pilot beam.  One of these locomotives survives.

 Surviving examples 

Five PA units and one converted PB unit survive.
One surviving unit, #600, is from the order of three broad gauge units sold to Companhia Paulista de Estradas de Ferro in Brazil. It exists at the Companhia Paulista Museum at Jundiai, São Paulo as a shell with no prime mover and no side panels. A restoration began in 2001 but has not been completed.
All four Delaware & Hudson-operated PA-4s have survived, with two being in the United States, and the other two in Mexico.
From 1981 to 2000, No.16 and No.18 remained stored in Empalme, Sonora, Mexico. In 2000, the Smithsonian Institution and rail preservationist Doyle McCormack obtained the units and brought them back to the United States.
No.16, which was heavily damaged in a derailment while in Mexico, was planned to be cosmetically restored into its original "Warbonnet" colors for the Smithsonian Institution. The unit was acquired by the Museum of the American Railroad in 2011 and transported to the museum's new site in Frisco, Texas. This unit will be restored to full operational status as America's PA for use in special trains across the United States.
No.18 is owned by Doyle McCormack and has been undergoing restoration since 2002. It is being restored as Nickel Plate Road 190, a recreation of the first locomotive McCormack got to ride. The locomotive was moved to the Oregon Rail Heritage Center, in Portland, Oregon in 2012, where restoration work continues to take place. In March 2023, it was announced that the Genesee Valley Transportation Company would purchase the locomotive.
No.17 and No.19 are preserved at the National Museum of Mexican Railways in Puebla. Unit DH-17 (former D&H #17) was painted in the classic Southern Pacific Daylight colors, but as of February 2010 had been painted over in primer.
Ex-Denver and Rio Grande PB-1 6002 was converted to a steam generator car in October 1965; it gained Blomberg B trucks in 1980. It was sold to Ansco in late 1987 for service on the Ski Train, and later sold again in 2007 to the Algoma Central Railway.

References

 Aslaksen, James and McCormack, Doyle. NKP190.com.  Retrieved on March 26, 2005.
 
 
 
 
 Stumpf, Rolf. ALCO World: Paulista RR''.  Retrieved on March 26, 2005.
 The Santa Fe Diesel Volume One: Dieselization - 1960 by Dr. Cinthia Priest pages 52–56.
 http://utahrails.net/ajkristopans/REPOWEREDLOCOMOTIVES.php see EMD order #8506 dated August 1954 for repowering data on the AT&SF 51 set of PAs.

External links

 America's PA project 
 DH-17 and DH-19 at the National Museum of Mexican Railroads website.

A1A-A1A locomotives
PA
Schenectady, New York
Passenger locomotives
Diesel-electric locomotives of the United States
Diesel-electric locomotives of Brazil
Railway locomotives introduced in 1946
Locomotives with cabless variants
Standard gauge locomotives of the United States
Standard gauge locomotives of Mexico
5 ft 3 in gauge locomotives
Diesel-electric locomotives of Mexico
Streamlined diesel locomotives